María Victoria de la Cruz (1916 - November 30, 1999) was a Cuban-Mexican cardiologist and embryologist who was instrumental in describing the development of the human heart in utero, and used the principles of embryology and developmental biology to classify complex congenital heart disease.

References 

Cuban women physicians
Mexican women physicians
Embryologists
Mexican cardiologists
1916 births
1999 deaths
20th-century Mexican physicians
Women cardiologists
20th-century women physicians
Cuban emigrants to Mexico